The 1996 Italian motorcycle Grand Prix was the fifth race of the 1996 Grand Prix motorcycle racing season. It took place on 26 May 1996 at the Mugello Circuit.

500 cc classification

250 cc classification

125 cc classification

References

Italian motorcycle Grand Prix
Italian
Motorcycle Grand Prix